The UHY Hacker Young Group is a Top 20  Group of UK chartered accountants, with 100 partners and 640 professional staff operating from 23 offices across the UK. Established in London in 1925, the group is also a founder member of UHY International, an international network of accountancy firms with 340 offices located in more than 100 countries across the globe. 

Total fee income for the year 2021/22 was £63.1 million, making UHY Hacker Young the 20th largest accountancy network in the UK.

Since its foundation, the firm has offered a broad range of services for owners of family businesses, including bookkeeping and auditing, tax compliance and advice, corporate recovery and company secretarial services. UHY Hacker Young has also helped companies float on the Alternative Investment Market (AIM) since its inception in 1995, providing them with advice on pre-IPO fund-raising, admissions, due diligence and tax assistance and planning.  In more recent years, the London office has launched international business desks for Malaysia, Russia & CIS, India, Germany, the US, the Persian Gulf region, Nordic countries and Israel.

Services

UHY Hacker Young is a professional services firm, thus covers a wide range of sectors:
audit,
business advisory & accounting,
cloud accounting,
corporate finance,
corporate tax,
FCA compliance,
private client services,
services for international businesses,
tax investigations, enquiries & disclosures,
turnaround & recovery and VAT.

Name and branding

UHY Hacker Young Group offices are known under the following titles:

UHY Hacker Young - London, Nottingham, Manchester, Abergavenny, Ashford, Birmingham, Brighton & Hove, Bristol, Broadstairs, Cambridge, Chester, Letchworth Garden City, Newport, Huntingdon, Sittingbourne, Sheffield & Winchester
UHY Calvert Smith - York
 UHY Hacker Young Fitch - Belfast
 UHY Ross Brooke - Abingdon, Hungerford, Newbury, Swindon

Notable clients

Andrew Andronikou, Michael Kiely & Peter Kubik of UHY Hacker Young were appointed administrators of Portsmouth Football Club when it went into administration on Friday 26 February 2010.

References

External links
 Official website
 UHY Hacker Young Early Careers website
 UHY International website
UHY Cloud Accounting website

Accounting firms of the United Kingdom